Thymol (also known as 2-isopropyl-5-methylphenol, IPMP), is a natural monoterpenoid phenol derivative of p-Cymene, isomeric with carvacrol, found in oil of thyme, and extracted from Thymus vulgaris (common thyme), ajwain, and various other plants as a white crystalline substance of a pleasant aromatic odor and strong antiseptic properties. Thymol also provides the distinctive, strong flavor of the culinary herb thyme, also produced from T. vulgaris. Thymol is only slightly soluble in water at neutral pH, but it is extremely soluble in alcohols and other organic solvents. It is also soluble in strongly alkaline aqueous solutions due to deprotonation of the phenol. Thymol absorbs maximum UV radiation at 274 nm.

Chemical synthesis 
Thymol is produced by the alkylation of m-cresol and propene:

History
Ancient Egyptians used thyme for embalming. The ancient Greeks used it in their baths and burned it as incense in their temples, believing it was a source of courage.  The spread of thyme throughout Europe was thought to be due to the Romans, as they used it to purify their rooms and to "give an aromatic flavour to cheese and liqueurs". In the European Middle Ages, the herb was placed beneath pillows to aid sleep and ward off nightmares. In this period, women also often gave knights and warriors gifts that included thyme leaves, because it was believed to bring courage to the bearer. Thyme was also used as incense and placed on coffins during funerals, because it was supposed to ensure passage into the next life.

The bee balms Monarda fistulosa and Monarda didyma, North American wildflowers, are natural sources of thymol. The Blackfoot Native Americans recognized these plants' strong antiseptic action and used poultices of the plants for skin infections and minor wounds. A tisane made from them was also used to treat mouth and throat infections caused by dental caries and gingivitis.

Thymol was first isolated by German chemist Caspar Neumann in 1719. In 1853, French chemist Alexandre Lallemand named thymol and determined its empirical formula. Thymol was first synthesized by Swedish chemist Oskar Widman in 1882.

Research
An in vitro study found thymol and carvacrol to be highly effective in reducing the minimum inhibitory concentration of several antibiotics against zoonotic pathogens and food spoilage bacteria such as Salmonella typhimurium SGI 1 and Streptococcus pyogenes ermB. In vitro studies have found thymol to be useful as an antifungal against food spoilage and bovine mastitis. Thymol demonstrates in vitro post-antibacterial effect against the test strains E. coli and P. aeruginosa (gram negative), and Staphylococcus aureus and B. cereus (gram positive). This antibacterial activity is caused by inhibiting growth and lactate production, and by decreasing cellular glucose uptake.

Thyme essential oil is useful in preservation of food. The antibacterial properties of thymol, a major part of thyme essential oil, as well as other constituents, are in part associated with their lipophilic character, leading to accumulation in bacterial membranes and subsequent membrane-associated events, such as energy depletion.

The antifungal nature of thymol against some fungi that are pathogenic to plants is due to its ability to alter the hyphal morphology and cause hyphal aggregates, resulting in reduced hyphal diameters and lyses of the hyphal wall.

Uses

Thymol during the 1910s was the treatment of choice for hookworm infection in the United States. People of the Middle East continue to use za'atar, a delicacy made with large amounts of thyme, to reduce and eliminate internal parasites.  It is also used as a preservative in halothane, an anaesthetic, and as an antiseptic in mouthwash. When used to reduce plaque and gingivitis, thymol has been found to be more effective when used in combination with chlorhexidine than when used purely by itself. Thymol is also the active antiseptic ingredient in some toothpastes, such as Johnson & Johnson's Euthymol. Thymol has been used to successfully control varroa mites and prevent fermentation and the growth of mold in bee colonies. Thymol is also used as a rapidly degrading, non-persisting pesticide. Thymol can also be used as a medical disinfectant and general purpose disinfectant.

List of plants that contain thymol
 Illicium verum
 Euphrasia rostkoviana
 Lagoecia cuminoides
 Monarda didyma
 Monarda fistulosa
 Mosla chinensis, Xiang Ru (香薷)
 Origanum compactum
 Origanum dictamnus
 Origanum onites
 Origanum vulgare
 Satureja thymbra
 Thymus glandulosus
 Thymus hyemalis
 Thymus vulgaris
 Thymus zygis
 Trachyspermum ammi

Toxicology and environmental impacts
In 2009, the U.S. Environmental Protection Agency (EPA) reviewed the research literature on the toxicology and environmental impact of thymol and concluded that "thymol has minimal potential toxicity and poses minimal risk".

Environmental breakdown and use as a pesticide
Studies have shown that hydrocarbon monoterpenes and thymol in particular degrade rapidly (DT50 16 days in water, 5 days in soil) in the environment and are, thus, low risks because of rapid dissipation and low bound residues, supporting the use of thymol as a pesticide agent that offers a safe alternative to other more persistent chemical pesticides that can be dispersed in runoff and produce subsequent contamination.

Compendial status
 British Pharmacopoeia
 Japanese Pharmacopoeia

See also
Thymoquinone
Nigella sativa
Bromothymol

Notes and references

External links

Fungicides
Disinfectants
Flavors
Monoterpenes
Alkylphenols
GABAA receptor positive allosteric modulators
Isopropyl compounds